Rune poems are poems that list the letters of runic alphabets while providing an explanatory poetic stanza for each letter. Three different poems have been preserved: the Anglo-Saxon Rune Poem, the Norwegian Rune Poem, and the Icelandic Rune Poem.

The Icelandic and Norwegian poems list 16 Younger Futhark runes, while the Anglo Saxon Rune Poem lists 29 Anglo-Saxon runes. Each poem differs in poetic verse, but they contain numerous parallels between one another. Further, the poems provide references to figures from Norse paganism and Anglo-Saxon paganism, the latter included alongside Christian references. A list of rune names is also recorded in the Abecedarium Nordmannicum, a 9th-century manuscript, but whether this can be called a poem or not is a matter of some debate.

The rune poems have been theorized as having been mnemonic devices that allowed the user to remember the order and names of each letter of the alphabet and may have been a catalog of important cultural information, memorably arranged; comparable with the Old English sayings, Gnomic poetry, and Old Norse poetry of wisdom and learning.

Rune poems

English

The Old English Rune Poem as recorded was likely composed in the 7th century and was preserved in the 10th-century manuscript Cotton Otho B.x, fol. 165a – 165b, housed at the Cotton library in London, England. In 1731, the manuscript was lost with numerous other manuscripts in a fire at the Cotton library. However, the poem had been copied by George Hickes in 1705 and his copy has formed the basis of all later editions of the poems.

George Hickes' record of the poem may deviate from the original manuscript. Hickes recorded the poem in prose, divided the prose into 29 stanzas, and placed a copper plate engraved with runic characters on the left-hand margin so that each rune stands immediately in front of the stanza where it belongs. For five of the runes (wen, hægl, nyd, eoh, and Ing) Hickes gives variant forms and two more runes are given at the foot of the column; cweorð and an unnamed rune (calc) which are not handled in the poem itself. A second copper plate appears across the foot of the page and contains two more runes: stan and gar.

Van Kirk Dobbie states that this apparatus is not likely to have been present in the original text of the Cotton manuscript and states that it's possible that the original Anglo-Saxon rune poem manuscript would have appeared similar in arrangement of runes and texts to that of the Norwegian and Icelandic rune poems.

Norwegian
The Norwegian Rune Poem was preserved in a 17th-century copy of a destroyed 13th-century manuscript. The Norwegian Rune Poem is preserved in skaldic metre, featuring the first line exhibiting a "(rune name)(copula) X" pattern, followed by a second rhyming line providing information somehow relating to its subject.

Icelandic
The Icelandic Rune Poem is recorded in four Arnamagnæan manuscripts, the oldest of the four dating from the late 15th century. The Icelandic Rune Poem has been called the most systemized of the rune poems (including the Abecedarium Nordmannicum) and has been compared to the ljóðaháttr verse form.

Example (Icelandic Rune Poem)

Here is an example of a rune poem with English translation side-by-side from Dickins:

Abecedarium Nordmannicum

Recorded in the 9th century, the Abecedarium Nordmannicum is the earliest known catalog of Norse rune names, though it does not contain definitions, is partly in Continental Germanic and also contains an amount of distinctive Anglo-Saxon rune types. The text is recorded in Codex Sangallensis 878, kept in the St. Gallen abbey, and may originate from Fulda, Germany.

See also
Briatharogaim
Gothic alphabet
List of runestones
Runic magic

Notes

References

  (1998). Revising Oral Theory: Formulaic Composition in Old English and Old Icelandic Verse. Routledge. 
  (1915). Runic and Heroic Poems of the Old Teutonic Peoples. Cambridge University Press. (Internet Archive)
  (Editor) (2007). Anglo-Saxon England. Cambridge University Press. 
  (1999). An Introduction to English Runes. Boydell Press. 
  (1942). The Anglo-Saxon Minor Poems. Columbia University Press 
 The Rune Poem (Old English), ed. and tr. , Poems of Wisdom and Learning in Old English. Cambridge, 1976: 80–5.
  et al. (eds.) Old English Poetry in Facsimile Project, (Madison, WI: Center for the History of Print and Digital Culture, 2019-). Online edition annotated and linked to digital facsimile, with a modern translation.

External links
Rune Poems from "Runic and Heroic Poems" by Bruce Dickins

Anglo-Saxon paganism
Germanic paganism
Old English poems
Runes
Poems, Rune
Scandinavia
Poetic forms
Cotton Library